Newbury is a hamlet near the village of Erriottwood, in the Swale district, in the English county of Kent. It is near the town of Sittingbourne.

References 
 Philip's Navigator Britain (page 93)

Hamlets in Kent
Borough of Swale